Seydougou is a town in northwestern Ivory Coast. It is a sub-prefecture and commune of Gbéléban Department in Kabadougou Region, Denguélé District, adjacent to the border with Ivory Coast.

In 2014, the population of the sub-prefecture of Seydougou was 4,397.

Villages
The 7 villages of the sub-prefecture of Seydougou and their population in 2014 are:
 Badouala  (360)
 Balala  (604)
 Gbessasso  (645)
 Kabala  (391)
 Kohouéna  (489)
 Sandjougouna  (395)
 Seydougou  (1 513)

References

Sub-prefectures of Kabadougou
Communes of Kabadougou